Främmestads IK is a sports club in Främmestad, Sweden, established 1941. The women's soccer team played in the Swedish top division between 1980 and 1987.

References

External links
Soccer 
Orienteering 

Football clubs in Västra Götaland County
1941 establishments in Sweden
Sports clubs established in 1941
Orienteering clubs in Sweden